The Logan County Courthouse, Southern Judicial District is a historic courthouse in Booneville, Arkansas, one of two county seats of Logan County.  It is a three-story masonry building, built out of buff brick with limestone trim.  It is stylistically in a restrained version of Italian Renaissance styling, with arched windows on the second level separated by pilasters with limestone capitals and bases.  It is the second courthouse for the southern district of Logan County, built on the site of the first.

The building was listed on the National Register of Historic Places in 1997.

See also
National Register of Historic Places listings in Logan County, Arkansas

References

Courthouses on the National Register of Historic Places in Arkansas
National Register of Historic Places in Logan County, Arkansas
Government buildings completed in 1928
Buildings and structures in Booneville, Arkansas
LOgan